SC Bümpliz 78 is a football team from Switzerland which plays in the 2L Interregional Group 2.

Current squad

References

External links
  Official Website

Association football clubs established in 1978
Bumpliz 78
1978 establishments in Switzerland
Bumpliz 78